Steimle is a German surname. Notable people with the surname include:

Eugen Steimle (1909–1987), German Nazi war criminal
Jannik Steimle (born 1996), German cyclist
, German standup comic

See also
Steimel

German-language surnames
de:Steimle